John Daniel Lawson (February 18, 1816 – January 24, 1896) was a U.S. Representative from New York.

Born in Montgomery, New York, Lawson attended the public schools, moved to New York City and was employed as a clerk in a dry-goods store. He became a successful merchant, and was active in politics as a Republican. Lawson served as a delegate to every Republican state, county, and district convention for thirty years, as well as the national conventions from 1868 to 1892. In 1884 he succeeded Thomas C. Platt as New York's member of the Republican National Committee.

Lawson was elected as a Republican to the Forty-third Congress (March 4, 1873 – March 3, 1875). After his unsuccessful bid for reelection, he resumed his former business pursuits. He died in New York City on January 24, 1896, and was interred in Green-Wood Cemetery.

References

Sources

1816 births
1896 deaths
Republican Party members of the United States House of Representatives from New York (state)
People from Montgomery, New York
Burials at Green-Wood Cemetery
19th-century American politicians